2020 President of the Senate of the Czech Republic election may refer to:

 February 2020 President of the Senate of the Czech Republic election.
 November 2020 President of the Senate of the Czech Republic election.